Zindziswa "Zindzi" Mandela (23 December 196013 July 2020), also known as Zindzi Mandela-Hlongwane, was a South African diplomat and poet, and the daughter of anti-apartheid activists and politicians Nelson Mandela and Winnie Madikizela-Mandela. Zindzi was the youngest and third of Nelson Mandela's three daughters, including sister Zenani Mandela.

She had served as her country's ambassador to Denmark, until her death in 2020, and was due to take up a post as ambassador to Liberia. She served as a stand-in First Lady of South Africa from 1996 to 1998.

Her collection of poems, Black As I Am, was published in 1978, with photographs by Peter Magubane.

Early life

Zindzi Mandela was born on 23 December 1960 in Soweto, in what was then the Union of South Africa, to Nelson and Winnie Mandela. The year of her birth was also the year that the African National Congress (ANC) launched its armed wing.  Her parents were wanted by the government.  Zindzi was 18 months old when her father was sent to prison.  During her youth she was often left in the care of her older sister Zenani Mandela when her mother was imprisoned for months at a time.

Career
In 1977, when her mother was banished to the Orange Free State, Zindzi went to live with her there. Zindzi was not able to complete her education until she was sent to Swaziland. Eventually, her mother was allowed to move back to Soweto. Zindzi's father was offered a conditional release in 1985 by the then-State President, P. W. Botha. Her father's reply could not be delivered by either one of her parents. Consequently, Zindzi was chosen to read his refusal at a public meeting on 10 February 1985.

Her poetry was published in 1978 in the book Black as I Am, with photographs by Peter Magubane, and has also appeared in publications including Somehow We Survive: An Anthology of South African Writing, edited by Sterling Plumpp (1982), and Daughters of Africa: An International Anthology of Words and Writings by Women of African Descent, edited by Margaret Busby (1992). Zindzi studied law at the University of Cape Town, where she earned a BA in 1985.

She served as a stand-in First Lady of South Africa from 1996 until 1998, between her parents' divorce and her father's remarriage, to Graça Machel.

Ambassadorship
Zindzi was appointed South Africa's ambassador to Denmark in 2014. She first arrived in Denmark in June 2015. In June 2019, while Ambassador to Denmark, Mandela's Twitter account sent a series of increasingly strongly worded tweets, where she discussed "trembling white cowards who are the thieving rapist descendants of Van Riebeck [sic]", and "uninvited visitors who don't want to leave" that caused significant controversy. Mandela-Hlongwane had previously that month expressed her "deep, pure unconditional love and respect" for "CIC" (leader) of the Economic Freedom Fighters (EFF), Julius Malema.

While being investigated by the Department of International Relations and Cooperation (DIRCO) for breaching their social media policy, Mandela remained defiant, tweeting that "I am not accountable to any white man or woman for my personal views. No missus or baas here. Get over yourselves #OurLand". She was ordered by foreign minister Naledi Pandor to "conduct herself as a diplomat" and to adhere to the department's social media policy, and concern about her views was expressed by former president Thabo Mbeki, and her views were described as hate speech by ANC veteran Mavuso Msimang, while her opinions drew support from the EFF and the Premier of KwaZulu-Natal Sihle Zikalala. Her tweets came close to the end of her four-year term as ambassador to Denmark.

At the time of her death in Johannesburg, she was designated to take up a post as ambassador to Liberia, a posting described by family members as a "punishment" for her controversial tweets the previous year.

Personal life and death
Zindzi was married twice and had four children from her first husband: daughter Zoleka Mandela (1980) and sons Zondwa Mandela (1985), Bambatha Mandela (1989) and Zwelabo Mandela (1992). Her first husband was Zwelibanzi Hlongwane. She married her second husband, Molapo Motlhajwa, who was a member of the South African National Defence Force, in March 2013.

Mandela-Hlongwane was said to have agreed to arrange a boxing match between Floyd Mayweather and Manny Pacquiao to coincide with her father's birthday in 2011. The match did not take place and the boxing promoter Duane Moody sued successfully for a US court to order that she pay US$4.7m, plus costs, in damages to Moody. Mandela-Hlongwane was expected to appeal.

Zindzi died on 13 July 2020, aged 59, at a hospital in Johannesburg. It was revealed that she had tested positive for COVID-19 on the day of her death. However, the virus was not said to be the cause of her death as her family awaited an autopsy report. She was buried next to her mother, Winnie Madikizela-Mandela, at Fourways Memorial Park on 17 July, a day before what would have been the 102nd birthday of her late father, Nelson Mandela.

Portrayals
 In the 2009 BBC telefilm Mrs Mandela, Zindzi was portrayed by Refilwe Pitsoe.
 Bonnie Henna portrayed Zindzi in the film Invictus (2009).
Xoliswa Sithole portrayed Zindzi in the TV film Mandela (1987).

References

Citations

Bibliography

External links
 
 Carolyne Wangui, "Zindzi Mandela Biography and Family" , Africanmania.com, 16 August 2017.
 Julia Llewellyn Smith, "Zindzi Mandela interview: the father I knew", The Telegraph, 15 December 2013.
 "Talk to Al Jazeera – Zindzi Mandela – 18 July 08 – Part 1" and "Talk to Al Jazeera – Zindzi Mandela – 18 July 08 – Part 2". YouTube video.

1960 births
2020 deaths
Deaths from the COVID-19 pandemic in South Africa
First Ladies of South Africa
Ambassadors of South Africa to Denmark
People from Soweto
Zindzi
Xhosa people
Waterford Kamhlaba alumni
People educated at a United World College
University of Cape Town alumni
South African women diplomats
South African women ambassadors
20th-century South African poets
21st-century South African poets
South African women poets